Lei Chen (8 July 1897 – 7 March 1979) was a Chinese politician and dissident who was the early leading figure in the movement to bring fuller democracy to the government of the Republic of China.

Born in Zhejiang in 1897, Lei was educated at Kyoto Imperial University in Japan. He also served on the Control Yuan, as minister without portfolio, and presidential adviser.

Lei Chen helped found and produce the periodical Free China, published beginning in 1950. Lei was expelled from the Kuomintang in 1954. Six years later, he founded the China Democratic Party with Hsu Shih-hsien and Huang Hua, among others. Shortly thereafter, Lei was charged with sedition and jailed. The charges are widely regarded as having been falsified by the Taiwan government and its then-ruling party the Kuomintang in response to Lei Chen's criticisms.

He was released in 1970 and died on 7 March 1979, aged 82. He was married to Sung Ying, who had also served on the Control Yuan. Lei was posthumously exonerated by the Transitional Justice Commission in May 2019.

References

External links 
Lei Zhen Papers Acquired by Hoover Institution Archives

1897 births
1979 deaths
Taiwanese activists
Taiwanese prisoners and detainees
Prisoners and detainees of Taiwan
Politicians from Huzhou
Taiwanese journalists
Writers from Huzhou
Taiwanese people from Zhejiang
Expelled members of the Kuomintang
Taiwanese Members of the Control Yuan
Government ministers of Taiwan
Senior Advisors to President Chiang Kai-shek
Taiwanese political party founders
Republic of China politicians from Zhejiang
20th-century Taiwanese politicians
20th-century journalists
Taiwanese politicians convicted of crimes
People convicted of sedition